Eythor Thorlaksson (Eyþór Þorláksson) (22 March 1930 – 14 December 2018) was an Icelandic guitarist and composer.

Life and work 
Eythor was born at Krosseyrarvegur in Hafnarfjörður. His parents where María Jakobsdóttir, from Aðalvík and Þorlákur Guðlaugsson from Biskupstungur.

In the years 1950–1952 he studied guitar in England, Denmark and Sweden and in 1953 in Madrid with Daniel Fortea and Quintin Esquembre. In the years 1954–1957 he studied harmony and counterpoint with Victor Urbancic and in 1958–1961 he completed his guitar studies with Graciano Tarragó in Barcelona. Since then he has been the principal guitar teacher at the music school in Hafnarfjordur and has arranged and written a lot of tutorial material for the classical guitar. In his retirement he continued to arrange and compose for the guitar.

Musical works
Guitar Methods
[1037] The first guitar lessons. Method for beginners with accompaniment. (Icelandic text). 
[1038] Guitar Method I. 1. grade. 
[1032] Guitar Method II. 2. grade. 

Collections
[1004] Guitar Tunes. Folk songs from all over, easy arrangements for the beginner. 76 tunes. (Icelandic text). 
[1005] Guitar Moment I. Collection and arrangements Eythor Thorlaksson. 
[1033] Guitar Moment II. Collection and arrangements Eythor Thorlaksson. 
[1034] Guitar Moment III. Collection and arrangements Eythor Thorlaksson. 
[1086] Guitar Moment IV. Collection and arrangements Eythor Thorlaksson. 

Studies
[1025] Scales and arpeggios. Collected and fingered by Eythor Thorlaksson. 1st – 8th grade. 
[1110] Sight reading samples. 1st – 8th grade. 
[1153] Studies 1 – 4. 
[1154] Studies 5 – 8. 

Compositions for Solo Guitar
[1157] Ragtime Chôro. 
[1165] Partita en E minor, Allemande, Courante, Sarabanda, Gavota, Giga. 
[1160] Valsecito. 
[1159] Estudio de contrapunto. 
[1162] Montparnasse. 
[1016] Las Buganvillas. 
[1029] Cachucha. 
[1156] Saludo. 
[1030] 6 Pop sketches. 
[1031] Rhimes. 
[1045] Improvisation no. 1, 2 and 3. 
[1047] Preludes no. 1, 2 and 3. 
[1049] Tonada de contrapunto. 
[1057] 8 guitar pieces. 
[1074] Chôro Andaluz. 
[1043] Chôro de Velez. 
[1044] Chôro de Feria.  
[1046] Sonatina Breve. 
[1021] Three little pieces. 
[1129] Suite Tropical. Onda Tropical – Aguas Claras – Vals Caribe. 
[1139] Sonatina Antigua. 
[1140] Sonatina Folklorica. 
[1143] Prelude no. 4. 
[1144] Waltz no. 6. 
[1151] Oración. 
[1174] Vals sureño. 
[1175] Danza Paraguaya . 
[1200] Arco Iris en Primavera. 
[1201] El tiempo pasa. 
[1202] Media Luna. 
[1208] El Payaso. 

Guitar Duets
[2001] Guitar duets – Volume I. 16 songs from different countries. 
[2004] Guitar duets – Volume II. 16 songs from different countries. 
[2007] Kanon fantasy. Guitar duet. (score and parts). 
[2027] Divertimento. Guitar duet.  
[2028] Brisa Marina. Guitar duet. 
[2039] Tema popular de Brasil. 

Guitar Trios
[3001] 12 Guitar trios for beginners. Arrangements by Eythor Thorlaksson. 
[3016] Allegretto. 
[3014] Andante al estilo antiguo. 
[3020] 3 trios. 

Guitar Quartets
[4016] Camino de Felanitx – Guitar Quartet. 
[4021] Cartama. 
[4023] Danza Andaluza. Arrangement by Eythor Thorlaksson (score and parts).

Guitar students 
 Pétur Jónasson
 Páll Eyjólfsson
 Hrafnhildur Hagalín Guðmundsdóttir
 Sveinn Eyþórsson
 Trausti Thorberg

References

External links 
 The Guitar School – Iceland

Classical guitarists
Composers for the classical guitar
1930 births
2018 deaths
Eythor Thorlaksson
Eythor Thorlaksson
Male guitarists
20th-century guitarists
20th-century male musicians